Bemis may refer to:

Companies
 Bemis Company, a packaging company
 Bemis Manufacturing Company, a manufacturer of toilet seats and other plastics products

People with the surname
 Andru Bemis (born 1978), American musician
 Edward Herbert Bemis (died 1901), who founded the Bemis Eye Sanitarium Complex
 Florence E. Bemis (1861?–?), American entomologist
 George Bemis (lawyer) (1816–1878), American lawyer from Massachusetts
 George P. Bemis (1838–1916), American developer and politician from Nebraska
 Harry Bemis (1874–1947), American baseball player
 Max Bemis (born 1984), American rock singer, of the band Say Anything
 Polly Bemis (1853–1933), Chinese–American pioneer
 Samuel Bemis (1793–1881), American photographer
 Harold Medberry Bemis (1884–1970), Rear Admiral in the United States Navy
 Samuel Flagg Bemis (1891–1973), American diplomatic historian
 Shane Bemis (born 1972), American politician from Oregon

Places
 Bemis, Watertown, Massachusetts
 Bemis, South Dakota
 Bemis, Tennessee
 Bemis, West Virginia